Fatsah Ouguergouz (born 1958) is an Algerian judge born in France.

Childhood and education 
He holds a PhD in international law from the Graduate Institute of International Studies (Geneva, Switzerland).

Legal career 
He has served as a judge of the African Court on Human and Peoples' Rights (located in Arusha, Tanzania) since 2006 and as Vice-President of this court since September 2012.  Elected initially in 2006 by the Assembly of Heads of State and Government of the African Union, he was re-elected in 2010 for a six-year mandate.

He was Secretary of the International Court of Justice and held the position of Independent Expert on the situation of human rights in Burundi, appointed by the United Nations Human Rights Council (2010-2011).

Positions 
He has held several positions within or outside the United Nations system, such as:

  Legal Officer, International Court of Justice (The Hague)
  Human Rights Officer, United Nations, Rwanda
  Associate Legal Officer, United Nations Office of Legal Affairs, New York City
  Lecturer, University of Geneva Faculty of Law
  Father Robert F. Drinan S.J. Visiting Professor of Human Rights, Georgetown University (Washington D.C.)
  Visiting Professor, Panthéon-Assas University
  Orville Schell Fellow, Yale Law School (New Haven, Connecticut)
  Senior Lecturer, Office of Legal Affairs, United Nations (New York), Regional Course in International Law Human Rights and Movement of persons (Addis Ababa)
  Senior Lecturer, American Bar Association, Rule of  Law Initiative (Washington D.C), Training of 60 Algerian Lawyers and Judges, Algiers and Oran (Algeria)
  Senior Lecturer, North African Litigation Initiative, Arabe Institute of Human Rights (Tunis) & Egyptian Initiative for Personal Rights (Cairo)
  Lecturer, Stetson University College of Law (Gulfport, Florida, USA), Summer Institute in International and Comparative Law, The Hague
  Lecturer, 34th Session of the External Programme of The Hague Academy of International Law, Addis Ababa (Ethiopia)
  Lecturer, 29th, 30th and 40th Study Sessions of the International Institute of Human Rights (Strasbourg, France).- Lecturer,  Study Session of the International Institute of Human Rights
  Secrétaire-rédacteur, Institute of International Law (from 1993 to 2003) 
  Lecturer, Training Sessions of the Institut International d’Administration Publique and Ecole Nationale d’Administration (Paris) (1996/1999/2002)
  Moderator, «Introduction to the United Nations System», Online Course, UNITAR (Geneva), Module 5: «The Principal Organs of the United Nations: Focus on the International Court of Justice»
  Member, International Advisory Committee, Brandeis Institute for International Judges, International Center for Ethics, Justice and Public Life, Brandeis University (Waltham, Massachusetts)
  Board Member, Institute of African Studies and Center for the Study of Human Rights (Banjul, The Gambia)

Books

 L’Union africaine: cadre juridique et institutionnel – Manuel sur l’Organisation panafricaine, (Co-Director with Judge Abdulqawi Yusuf), Editions Pedone, Paris, 2013, 471 pages
  The African Union: Legal and Institutional Framework - A Manual on the Pan-African Organization (Co-Director with Judge Abdulqawi Yusuf), Martinus Nijhoff Publishers, Leiden/Boston, 2012, 576 pages
 The African Charter on Human and People's Rights: a comprehensive agenda for human dignity and sustainable democracy in Africa, Martinus Nijhoff Publishers, The Hague/London/New York, 2003, 1016 pages
 La Charte Africaine des Droits de l'Homme et des Peuples: une approche juridique des droits de l'homme entre tradition et modernité, Presses Universitaires de France, Paris, 1993, 479 pages

References

Judges of the African Court on Human and Peoples' Rights
Living people
Graduate Institute of International and Development Studies alumni
Algerian judges
United Nations special rapporteurs
Algerian officials of the United Nations
Algerian judges of international courts and tribunals
Jean Monnet University alumni
1958 births
21st-century Algerian people
Members of the Institut de Droit International